Mohiuddin Ahmad (born 1952) is a Bangladeshi writer and political historiographer, mainly known for his historical studies of the major political parties in Bangladesh. His notable works include Jasader Utthan Patan: Asthir Samayer Rajniti (The Rise and Fall of JASAD: Politics of Restless Time), Awami League: Utthanparba 1948–1970 (Awami League: The Ascent 1948–1970), Awami League: Juddhadiner Kotha (Awami League: Story of War Days) and BNP: Samay-Asamay (BNP: Ups and Downs).

Biography
Born in Dhaka, he studied economics at the University of Dhaka. He was elected co-general secretary of Haji Muhammad Mohsin Hall Students’ Union in the election of Dhaka University Students’ Union in 1970. He worked as a reporter and assistant editor in the Daily Ganakantha. He also directed a master's programme in NGO studies at Sungkonghoe University in South Korea, where he was also a professor.

Works
'Jasader Utthan Patan: Asthir Samayer Rajniti (জাসদের উত্থান পতন: অস্থির সময়ের রাজনীতি, The Rise and Fall of JASAD: Politics of Restless Time, 2014)
Ek-Egaro: Bangladesh 2007-2008 (এক-এগারো: বাংলাদেশ ২০০৭-২০০৮, One-Eleven: Bangladesh 2007–2008, 2019)
BNP: Samay-Asamay (বিএনপি : সময়-অসময়, BNP: Good Times, Bad Times)
Awami League: Utthanparba 1948–1970 (আওয়ামী লীগঃ উত্থানপর্ব ১৯৪৮-১৯৭০, Awami League: The Ascent 1948–1970) 
Awami League: Juddhadiner Kotha (আওয়ামী লীগ : যুদ্ধদিনের কথা ১৯৭১, Awami League: Story of War Days) 
Rajneetir Ameemangsita Gadya (রাজনীতির অমীমাংসিত গদ্য, Uncompromised Prose of Politics)
Ei Deshe Ekdin Juddha Hoyechilo (এই দেশে একদিন যুদ্ধ হয়েছিল, War Took Place One Day in This Country) 
Itihaser Jatree (ইতিহাসের যাত্রী, History-Treader)
Boma Banduker Chorabajar (বোমা বন্দুকের চোরাবাজার, Black Market of Bombs and Guns)
32 Namber Pasher Bari: 25 March 15 August (৩২ নম্বর পাশের বাড়ি: ২৫ মার্চ ১৫ আগস্ট)
Bangalir Japan Abishkar (বাঙালির জাপান আবিষ্কার, Bengali's Discovery of Japan) 
Bela-Abela: Bangladesh 1972-1975 (বেলা-অবেলা: বাংলাদেশ ১৯৭২-১৯৭৫, Good Times Bad Times: Bangladesh 1972-1975) 
লাল সন্ত্রাস: সিরাজ সিকদার ও সর্বহারা রাজনীতি Mohiuddin Ahmmod - মহিউদ্দিন আহমদ

In English
Seol Diary

References

Bangladeshi writers
University of Dhaka alumni
1952 births
Living people
Dhaka College alumni